Baron Fredegandus (Fredegand) Patricius Josephus Maria Cogels (14 April 1850 – 17 February 1932) was a Belgian politician and a member of the Meeting party. He was governor of the province of Antwerp from 16 December 1900 until 28 May 1907 and for a short while after World War I in 1918.

Political career 
Fredegand Cogels was senator in the Belgian Senate from 1892 until 1900 and again from 1918 until 1920.

Sources 
 Steve Heylen, Bart De Nil, Bart D’hondt, Sophie Gyselinck, Hanne Van Herck en Donald Weber, Geschiedenis van de provincie Antwerpen. Een politieke biografie, Antwerpen, Provinciebestuur Antwerpen, 2005, Vol. 2 p. 33

1850 births
1932 deaths
Governors of Antwerp Province
People from Antwerp Province